EA Playground is a video game for the Nintendo DS and Wii by Electronic Arts. The game is inspired by Wii Sports.

Gameplay 

The Wii game features various mini-games structured around a singleplayer "campaign" and a multiplayer party mode. All of the mini-games are based on well known playground games. These include Dodgeball, Tetherball, Slot car racing, paper airplane racing, dart shootout and wall ball. Also included is "Kicks", which is a mix of the sports Soccer and Volleyball (Sepak takraw). More games can be unlocked by progressing through the single player campaign.

The Nintendo DS version of the game includes several exclusive game modes including Spitballs (which uses the microphone input), Bug Hunt, and Skateboarding which takes advantage of the stylus. Again, the games are unlocked by going through the Single Player Campaign.  These games can then be played in the Quick Play mode.

After you complete all the games and dares, you can play the (Gauntlet) a game made by the sticker king, Connor. After you beat him, you unlock the sticker king's sticker showing the player's winning emotion. This emotion can also seen by winning a tourney in multiplayer. (Only Wii version) you can also unlock the sticker king in multi player.

Included games and version differences

Reception
The game received mixed reviews, with the DS version getting slightly better reviews. For the Wii version, IGN gave the game a 6.6/10 rating, saying that it was a passable effort to emulate Wii Sports, praising the marble and stickers system to upgrade abilities along with its presentation, but criticizing the game for its lack of a mini-game as fun or addictive as the Wii Sports ones were. They also gave the DS version a 7.0/10, stating that it was slightly better than the Wii version and that it would appeal better to younger gamers due to it being on the DS.

References

External links 
 EA Playground at Electronic Arts.com
 Preview at IGN
 DS review at IGN
 Wii review at Gamespot

2007 video games
Electronic Arts games
Fantasy sports video games
Nintendo DS games
Video games developed in Canada
Video games featuring protagonists of selectable gender
Wii games